The 1928–29 season was the 56th season of competitive football in Scotland and the 39th season of the Scottish Football League.

Scottish League Division One 

Champions: Rangers
Relegated: Third Lanark, Raith Rovers

Scottish League Division Two 

NOTE: 
Arthurlie resigned – fixtures stand 
Bathgate resigned – fixtures expunged

Promoted: Dundee United, Greenock Morton

Scottish Cup

Kilmarnock were winners of the Scottish Cup after a 2–0 win over last years winners Rangers.

Other honours

National

County 

. * aggregate over two legs

Highland League

Junior Cup 

Dundee Violet were winners of the Junior Cup after a 4–0 win over Denny Hibs in the final replay.

Scotland national team 

Scotland were winners of the 1928–29 British Home Championship. 1929 also saw Scotland compete against non-British teams for the first time.

Key:
 (H) = Home match
 (A) = Away match
 BHC = British Home Championship

See also
Glasgow Dental Hospital Cup

References

External links 
 Scottish Football Historical Archive

 
Seasons in Scottish football